Luxembourg Airport  is the main airport in Luxembourg. Previously called Luxembourg Findel Airport due to its location at Findel, it is Luxembourg's only international airport and is the only airport in the country with a paved runway. In 2019, it handled 4.4 million passengers. It is a major cargo airport, ranking as Europe's fifth-busiest by cargo tonnage and the world's 28th-busiest in 2010. Luxair, Luxembourg's international airline, and cargo airline Cargolux have their head offices on the airport property.

History

Early years
The airport was originally known as "Sandweiler Airport", and was opened in the 1930s as a small grass airfield with a relatively short,  runway.

World War II
Neutral Luxembourg was invaded by Germany on 10 May 1940, and on 21 May the Luftwaffe assigned Jagdgeschwader 53 (JG 53), a Messerschmitt Bf 109 fighter unit, to the airport. JG 53 was engaged in combat against the French and British Expeditionary Force in France during the Battle of France in May and June. In addition, Jagdgeschwader 52 (JG 52) operated Bf 109s from Sandweiler during the Blitzkrieg. JG 52 moved into France on 29 May but JG 53 remained in Luxembourg until 18 August when it moved closer to the English Channel to take part in the Battle of Britain.

Sandweiler Airport then remained unused by the Luftwaffe until September 1944, when Aufklärungsgruppe 123 (AKG 123), a reconnaissance unit which flew the Henschel Hs 126, a two-seat reconnaissance and observation aircraft, was assigned to the airport. AKG 123 moved east into Germany after only a few days when the United States Army moved through Luxembourg and cleared the country of the occupying German forces.

Allied use
United States Army combat engineers arrived at Sandweiler in mid September 1944 and performed some minor reconstruction to prepare the airfield for Ninth Air Force combat aircraft. The airfield was designated as Advanced Landing Ground "A-97" Sandweiler and was opened on 18 September 1944. The Ninth Air Force 363d Tactical Reconnaissance Group operated a variety of photo-reconnaissance aircraft until 29 October 1944 when they also moved east into Germany.

Sandweiler Airport was used by the Americans for the rest of the war as a transport supply airfield and also to evacuate combat casualties to the UK. It was returned to Luxembourgish control on 15 August 1945.

Present
Using a Boeing 767, Luxair launched direct flights to Newark in March 1999. The route proved unprofitable, so the carrier cancelled it later that year. Three years later, TAROM began routing its flight from Bucharest to New York through Luxembourg in an attempt to increase passenger loads.

Luxembourg Airport has constructed a high-security zone far away from most airport activities in order to attract the business of transporting valuable goods such as art and jewels. According to Hiscox, there is a "massive demand" for such a hub for precious cargo. Planes taxi away from main airport facilities before loading.

In 2015, the airline with the largest share of the airport's total passenger volume was still Luxair with 1.69 million passengers at a 63% share.

Luxembourg Airport was closed to all passenger traffic for a week from 23 March to 29 March 2020 as a public health measure during the COVID-19 pandemic.

Terminals

Terminal A
Built in 1975, the building was the only terminal of the airport for 30 years, until terminal B opened in 2004. The terminal was getting overcrowded especially during the summer period, and only contained four shops, a post office  and a restaurant. The terminal started to be demolished at the end of 2011 and was complete by March 2012; this was to make way for a footbridge connecting terminal B to the new terminal A. Construction of the new Terminal A started in 2005 and it was inaugurated in May 2008.

Terminal B
Terminal B opened in 2004, the building is unique as it only has gates and no check-in counters or arrivals hall. It was built for small planes with a maximum capacity of 50 people. It can handle up to 600,000 passengers a year. The Terminal reopened in the summer of 2017 after some arrangements to handle aircraft with a capacity of up to 110 passengers and a total of 1 million passengers annually . It is mainly used by Luxair's Q400 fleet.

Airlines and destinations

Passenger
The following airlines operate regular scheduled and charter flights at Luxembourg Airport:

Cargo

Statistics

Routes

Passengers

Traffic

Ground transportation
The airport can be reached via autoroute A1 (Luxembourg City - Trier) and is also connected with the surrounding areas by public bus transport route 29, which also reaches Luxembourg railway station, and bus route 16, as well as by a cross-border coach service to nearby Trier in Germany. It is planned that a tram line will reach the airport in 2024.

Incidents and accidents
 On 22 December 1969, Vickers Viscount LX-LGC of Luxair was damaged beyond economic repair when it ran off the runway and the nose wheel collapsed.
 On 29 September 1982, Aeroflot Flight 343 ran off the runway on landing.
 On 6 November 2002, Luxair Flight 9642, Fokker 50 (registration LX-LGB) from Berlin, Germany crashed in a field near the village of Niederanven during its final approach. 20 passengers and crew were killed.
 On 21 January 2010, Cargolux Flight 7933 Boeing 747-4R7F from Barcelona, Spain crashed when landing he collided with a car on the runway.

Claims of language discrimination 
In 2021, it was announced that public announcements in Luxembourgish (and in German as well) at Luxembourg Airport would cease after many decades of use; it would only be using French and English for future public announcements. Actioun Lëtzebuergesch declared itself to be hugely upset by this new governmental measure, citing that other airports in the world seem to have no problems making public announcements in multiple languages; according to a poll conducted by AL, 92.84% of people in Luxembourg wished to have public announcements to be made in Luxembourgish at Luxembourg Airport.

All written signs at Luxembourg Airport are only in French and English. This non-use of Luxembourgish and German (two official languages of Luxembourg) have fueled claims of language discrimination, some pointing out that other airports seem to have no difficulties using up to 4 different languages in written signs. (Palma de Mallorca Airport for example uses Mallorquí, English, Spanish and German, the latter not even being an official language of the country)

See also
 World's busiest airports by cargo traffic
 Advanced Landing Ground
 Luxembourg Freeport

References

External links

 Official website
 Luxembourg Airport Authority
 
 Airport webcams, flight timetables and pilot data

Airports in Luxembourg
Sandweiler
Airport
World War II sites in Luxembourg
Airports established in 1930
World War II airfields in the European Theater
1930 establishments in Luxembourg